Sonja Wiedemann (born 8 September 1977) is a German luger who competed from 1999 to 2005. She won two medals in the women's singles at the FIL World Luge Championships with a gold in 1999 and a bronze in 2000.

Wiedemann also won a silver medal in the mixed team event at the 2000 FIL European Luge Championships in Winterberg, Germany.

References
FIL-Luge profile
Hickok sports information on World champions in luge and skeleton.
List of European luge champions 
SportQuick.com information on World champions in luge.

External links
 

1977 births
Living people
German female lugers